Sahaj Path (Bengali: সহজ পাঠ) is a Bengali language learning book, written by Rabindranath Tagore. In two of its edition this book describes the basics of Bengali language and literature. The first edition (প্রথম ভাগ) has the preliminary ideas of Bengali alphabet, their structures, pronunciation while the second edition (দ্বিতীয় ভাগ) includes usage of words in a sentences, paragraphs, and teaches structure of rhymes. These books, illustrated by famous Indian artist Nandalal Bose, are pioneer in learning Bengali language.

References 

Bengali-language books
Year of work missing